The 2020–21 Algerian Ligue 2 was the 57th season of the Algerian Ligue 2 since its establishment. the competition was organized in this season by the Ligue Nationale de football Amateur (LNFA) and the system changed into three groups, west, central and east, each group with 12 clubs. The ligue 2 returns to its amateur format

On December 28,  Ligue Nationale du football Amateur Changed the competition's format from 2 groups of 18 to 3 groups of 12.

Stadiums and locations

Group East
Note: Table lists in alphabetical order.

Group Centre
Note: Table lists in alphabetical order.

Group West
Note: Table lists in alphabetical order.

Locations

Results

Group East

East clubs season-progress

Group Centre

Centre clubs season-progress

Group West

West clubs season-progress

Promotion play-offs
The play-offs are organized by the Ligue Nationale du Football Amateur (LNFA).

Rules
The winners have three points.
The winners after penalties free kicks have two points.
The losers after penalties free kicks have one points.
The losers have zero points.

All times are UTC (UTC+1).

Matches

Classification

Season statistics

Top scorers

Updated to games played on 15 September 2020 Source: [ footballdatabase.eu]

Updated to games played on 15 September 2020 Source: [ footballdatabase.eu]

Updated to games played on 15 September 2020 Source: [ footballdatabase.eu]

Hat-tricks

See also
 2020–21 Algerian Ligue Professionnelle 1

References

External links
 Ligue Nationale de Football Amateur
 Algerian Football Federation

Algerian Ligue 2 seasons
2
Algeria